Levashi (Dargwa: Лаваша) is a rural locality (a selo) and the administrative center of Levashinsky District of the Republic of Dagestan, Russia. Population:  During the Russian Empire, the settlement was the administrative capital of the Darginsky Okrug.

References

Sources 

Rural localities in Levashinsky District